Whitmell is an unincorporated community in Pittsylvania County, in the U.S. state of Virginia. It is the location of the now-closed historic Whitmell Farm-Life School named for Whitmell P. Tunstall, a lawyer and state legislator.

It was originally named Chestnut Grove. An 1855 gazetteer listed the village as having "3 stores, several tobacco factories, and about 100 inhabitants".

References

Unincorporated communities in Virginia
Unincorporated communities in Pittsylvania County, Virginia